The 1924 European Wrestling Championships were held in Offenbach (Germany) in 1924 under the organization of the International Federation of Associated Wrestling (FILA) and the German Wrestling Federation. It only competed in the Greco-Roman style categories.

Medal summary

Men's Greco-Roman

References

External links
FILA Database

1924 in European sport
Sports competitions in Germany